Fu Xiaotian is the presenter and producer of Talk with World Leaders. She is a recipient of the Order of the Star of Italy. Fu worked in London when she first joined Phoenix TV, taking on the roles of Chief Correspondent and Bureau Chief. In 2011, she journeyed twice to Libya as a wartime reporter. The following year, she transferred to Phoenix TV’s Hong Kong headquarters, where she worked as a Senior Reporter, covering major political events internationally.

Early life 
Fu Xiaotian was born in Chongqing, China. She received a Bachelor's degree from Beijing Language and Culture University and another from Peking University. She received a Master's degree in Education from Churchill College, Cambridge in 2007.

Talk with World Leaders 
Talk with World Leaders is a one-on-one interview program on Phoenix TV, aiming to provide a platform for international leaders to communicate their views directly to Chinese audiences.  The 32-minute program broadcasts worldwide on Phoenix Chinese Channel, Phoenix North American Channel, Phoenix European Channel, as well as Phoenix Hong Kong Channel on weekly basis. It is also available online from the Phoenix application and website. Guests of Talk with World Leaders include, listed alphabetically, Mahmoud Ahmadinejad (Iran), Shimon Peres (Israel), Muammar Gaddafi (Libya), Yasser Arafat (Palestine), Vladimir Putin (Russia) and Ronald Reagan (USA). Fu has headed the program since 2014, interviewing major personalities such as Ban Ki-moon, Shinzo Abe, John Kerry, Henry Kissinger and Bashar al-Assad.

Awards and recognition 

Fu was knighted with the Order of Stella d'Italia (Star of Italy) by President Sergio Mattarella of Italy in 2017. Italy’s Ambassador to China at the time, Ettore Sequi, delivered a speech at the ceremony, saying: "Fu Xiaotian is a star. She’s not only a star for Chinese television, but she’s a star for those who have the chance to meet her. It’s sort of a polar star of Italy in China, and I would say beyond. As far as I remember, she has interviewed one Italian Minister of Foreign Affairs, two Italian Prime Ministers, and the President of the Italian Republic. I think that no one in the world has such a record. She always did it with grace, with extreme professionalism, and with a committed heart, so that our President, our Prime Ministers, and our Minister of Foreign Affairs have kept the interview as one of their most meaningful experiences in China."

In 2020, Fu was an award presenter for the International Emmy award for Best Documentary.

Philanthropy 

Fu participates in a variety of philanthropic endeavors. In 2016, her alma mater, Churchill College at the University of Cambridge named a garden after her – The Xiaotian Fu Garden – to recognize her support for education, learning and research. The then Director-General of UNESCO, Irina Bokova, sent a message of congratulation on the occasion of the naming ceremony, saying it was "a recognition of what Ms. Xiaotian Fu is doing. Meething through her program Talk with World Leaders, to encourage international cooperation; to encourage young people to be more engaged to participate in the life of their communities; to achieve excellence in higher education. I think this is what we need nowadays, in a world that is globalized, that is full of challenges, but of course with a lot of opportunities, and we have to use these opportunities for young people to make them part of the answer to the pressing needs that we have nowadays."

Publications 

 Talk with World Leaders on China (世界政要谈中国：晓田访谈录)  (2017)
 Meeting World Leaders (风云之交)  (2020)

References 

Chinese television presenters
Year of birth missing (living people)
Living people
Alumni of Churchill College, Cambridge